Jagmohan Malhotra (25 September 1927 – 3 May 2021), known by the mononym Jagmohan, was an Indian civil servant and politician. After working with the Indian National Congress, he joined the Bharatiya Janata Party in 1995. He served as Lieutenant Governor of Delhi and Goa, as the 5th Governor of Jammu and Kashmir, and for three terms as Member of Parliament for New Delhi. In the cabinet, he served as Union Minister for Urban Development and Tourism.

Early life
Jagmohan Malhotra was born in a Punjabi Hindu Khatri family to Amir Chand and Dropadi Devi on 25 September 1927 in Hafizabad, British India. He got married in 1957 to Uma, who came to be known as Uma Jagmohan.

Career 
Jagmohan admired Georges-Eugene Haussmann. Jagmohan first gained notoriety during his stint as vice-chairman of the Delhi Development Authority in the mid 1970s. During this time he grew close to Sanjay Gandhi, who functioned as an informal advisor to his mother, Prime Minister Indira Gandhi. During the Emergency (1975–77), Sanjay Gandhi entrusted Jagmohan with the "beautification" of Delhi, a task that involved large-scale demolition of slums. Jagmohan was very effective with the task. Already a Padma Shri since 1971, he was awarded the Padma Bhushan in 1977. 

In 1982, as Delhi hosted the Asian Games, Jagmohan was serving his second term as Lieutenant Governor of the city. The games were a success and Jagmohan's capable administration received credit. Later Delhi hosted the Non-Aligned Summit, which was also a success.

Governor of Jammu and Kashmir 
During his tenure as Governor of Jammu and Kashmir (1984–89), the 1986 Kashmir Riots had taken place, curfew was imposed, media was banned and state force was used relentlessly.  Pakistan's prime minister Benazir Bhutto in a series of speeches notoriously threatened to make him "Bhagmohan" (Bhag meaning "run", implying he would flee out of fear), and that "Ham us ko jag jag mo mo han han bana denge" (transl."We will make him JagJag Mo Mo Han Han", implying he would be cut/torn to pieces by militants). In Jammu and Kashmir, Jagmohan is credited with bringing order to one of the most revered shrines of Hindus, called Mata Vaishno Devi. He created a board that continues to provide administration for the shrine. Infrastructure was developed and that continues to facilitate pilgrims. 

In 1989, when militancy re-exploded in Kashmir, Jagmohan was re-appointed its governor by Prime Minister V. P. Singh's led Janta Dal government. The locals see him as the architect of Gaw Kadal Massacre in which more than 60 civilians were killed by Indian paramilitary forces although he was not involved in it. He fell out of favour of the Union government, and joined the BJP few years later in around 1994. However, allegations persist that he was involved in extra-legal crackdowns in Kashmir engineered by Mufti Mohammad Sayeed.

Electoral history
Jagmohan contested the seat for New Delhi in the Lok Sabha in 1996 for the 11th Lok Sabha, where he defeated Bollywood star Rajesh Khanna by 58,000 votes. In 1998 and 1999, Jagmohan won the seat again defeating R K Dhawan of the Indian National Congress twice.

In BJP Government
When the BJP's Atal Bihari Vajpayee became Prime Minister in 1998, Jagmohan served in his cabinet in a variety of portfolios, including communications, urban development and tourism. During the 1990s, Jagmohan had served as a nominated MP in the Rajya Sabha in 1990–96, and won three Lok Sabha elections from New Delhi in 1996, 1998 and 1999.

In 2004, he lost to Ajay Maken of the Indian National Congress by 12,784 votes.

In 2019, Jagmohan participated in BJP's Outreach Campaign to increase awareness about the advantages of revoking Article 370 & 35A.

Awards and honours 

On the basis of his service record and recommendations made by top civil servants, he was honoured, on 26 January 1971, with the award of Padma Shri by the President of India, "for formulation and implementation of the Delhi Master Plan and for playing a pioneering role in planning and implementation of projects in Delhi".

With a meager revolving fund of just Rs. Five crore, Jagmohan launched large number of land acquisition and development schemes, showcasing how development effort could be financed by creating facilities – thus increasing value of the state land resources. For a series of innovations of this genre, good  management skills, and for "his meritorious services to the country" he was awarded Padma Bhushan in 1977. In 2016, Padma Vibhushan was awarded to him. As Implementation Commissioner, and later as Vice-Chairman, Delhi Development Authority, Jagmohan executed various Parliament approved schemes of Clearance-cum-Resettlement-cum-Redevelopment, which critics called demolition drives.

Jagmohan was one of the founders of the Samkalp Foundation which provides civil services examination coaching to poor and marginal students along with accommodation and other facilities. He wrote "My Frozen Turbulence in Kashmir".

Death 
Jagmohan Malhotra died in Delhi on 3 May 2021, at the age of 93.

Positions held 

 1980–81: Lt. Governor, Delhi (two times)
 1981–82: Lt. Governor, Goa, Daman and Diu
 1984–89 and 1990 (Jan - May): Governor, Jammu and Kashmir (two times) 
 1990–96: Member (nominated), Rajya Sabha
During the 1990s, Jagmohan had served as nominated MP in the Rajya Sabha (the upper house of the Indian Parliament) from 1990 to 1996. Later, he was elected to the Lok Sabha (the lower house of the Indian Parliament) thrice from New Delhi.
 1996: Elected to 11th Lok Sabha from New Delhi
 1998: Re-elected to 12th Lok Sabha (2nd term) from New Delhi
 1998-December:  Union Cabinet Minister, Communications 
 1999-June–October: Union Cabinet Minister, Urban Development
 1999: Re-elected to 13th Lok Sabha (3rd term) from New Delhi
 1999-October–November: Union Cabinet Minister, Urban Development
 2001-September: Union Cabinet Minister, Tourism
 2001-November-2004-April:  Union Cabinet Minister, Tourism and Culture

Books authored 
 Rebuilding Shahjahanabad, the Walled City of Delhi (1975) 
 Island of Truth (1978) 
 My frozen turbulence in Kashmir (1993)
 The Challenge of Our Cities (1984) 
 Soul and Structure of Governance in India (2005)
 Reforming Vaishno Devi and a Case for Reformed, Reawakened and Enlightened Hinduism (2010) 
 Triumphs and Tragedies of Ninth Delhi (2015)

References

Bibliography

External links 

 
 

1927 births
2021 deaths
People from Hafizabad District
India MPs 1996–1997
India MPs 1998–1999
India MPs 1999–2004
Governors of Jammu and Kashmir
Lieutenant Governors of Delhi
Lok Sabha members from Delhi
Nominated members of the Rajya Sabha
Recipients of the Padma Shri in civil service
Recipients of the Padma Bhushan in civil service
Recipients of the Padma Vibhushan in public affairs
Bharatiya Janata Party politicians from Delhi
Indian Administrative Service officers